TAFE Queensland East Coast covers the Sunshine Coast and part of the Wide Bay Burnett region in Queensland, Australia. It was formed in 2013 by the amalgamation of the Sunshine Coast Institute of TAFE and the Wide Bay Institute of TAFE and has eight campus locations.

As of 2017 TAFE Queensland commenced consolidating its six regional registered training organisations (RTOs) into a single RTO. TAFE Queensland East Coast now no longer exists as a separate RTO.

Campus locations
Bundaberg
Gympie
Hervey Bay
Maroochydore
Maryborough
Mooloolaba
Nambour
Sunshine Coast Health Institute

See also
TAFE Queensland

References

External links
TAFE Queensland

TAFE Queensland
Education in Queensland